Skoob Books is a bookshop selling secondhand books focusing on academic subjects, located in the Brunswick Centre, in Bloomsbury, central London, UK.

Overview 
Skoob Books has over 70,000 titles within their two shops and 100,000 online. The shops are based in a basement of the Brunswick Centre and in a retail space on its ground floor. It has secondhand works on politics, history, literature, art, philosophy, to the natural sciences.

Included within this are also postcards and photographs.

The main shop itself is underground, sprawling out into distinct sections from sci-fi, social sciences, arts, and natural sciences.

Its warehouse is based in Oxford where it holds over a million book titles.

History 
Skoob Books originally started in a ground floor unit at the Brunswick Centre. This was later closed down and the shop moved to the basement of the centre in 2008.

During the COVID-19 pandemic, Skoob Books opened their ground floor retail unit once more as a pop-up shop.

In 2010 the Times Out magazine voted Skoob Books "the best bookshop in London".

Gallery

References 

Bookshops in London
Bookstores established in the 21st century